Black balsam may refer to: 
 Balsam of Peru, a resinous balsam derived from trees of the genus Myroxylon, grown in Central and South America
 Riga Black Balsam, a traditional Latvian herbal liqueur